Peter Blank (born 10 April 1962) is a German track and field athlete who competed in the javelin throw. Early on in his career, he was a decathlete. In 1992, he set the world record for longest javelin throw in a decathlon with a distance of 79.80 m.

His personal best throw is 88.70 m, achieved in June 2001 in Stuttgart at age 39. This throw was briefly a Masters M35 world record; it lasted less than a week because Jan Železný had turned 35 three weeks earlier and in his first competition after turning 35, Železný threw the javelin 89.94 m. Železný then further improved the record to 92.80 m at the 2001 World Championships, putting it beyond Blank's reach. Two years later, Blank set the M40 world record with an 84.08 m throw, but was again bested once Železný turned 40 and improved the record to 85.92 m. In 2007, Blank set the M45 world record, surpassing the record by Larry Stuart that had stood for 21 years. As of 2017, this record continues to stand, unsurpassed by Železný when he turned 45, or any other javelin thrower.

Achievements

Seasonal bests by year
1987 - 77.94
1988 - 80.84
1989 - 79.60
1991 - 82.62
1992 - 81.12
1993 - 80.76
1994 - 82.56
1995 - 83.18
1996 - 88.12
1997 - 86.84
1998 - 86.99
1999 - 87.11
2000 - 85.45
2001 - 88.70
2002 - 82.24
2003 - 84.08
2004 - 82.65
2005 - 76.00
2007 - 77.15

References

1962 births
Living people
German male javelin throwers
Athletes (track and field) at the 1996 Summer Olympics
Olympic athletes of Germany
World record holders in masters athletics
German masters athletes
Sportspeople from Frankfurt